Antipope John may refer to:

 Antipope John VIII (844), in opposition to Pope Sergius II
 Antipope John XVI (997–998), in opposition to Pope Gregory V
 Antipope John XXIII (1410–1415), in opposition to Pope Gregory XII

See also 
 Pope John (disambiguation)